"You to Me Are Everything" is a song by British soul group the Real Thing, released as a single in 1976. Written by Ken Gold and Michael Denne and produced by Gold, "You to Me Are Everything" was the Real Thing's sole number-one single on the UK Singles Chart, spending three weeks at the top in July 1976. The song was re-released ten years later titled the "Decade Remix" which returned the song to the chart in March 1986, reaching number five.

The song has been covered by a number of artists, including Sonia and Sean Maguire, whose versions also charted in the UK.

Background
The Real Thing first appeared on the ITV talent show Opportunity Knocks, to which they then acquired a manager, Tony Hall who secured them a recording contract with Pye Records.  For their debut single, they recorded "You to Me Are Everything". The song was written by producer Ken Gold together with Micky Denne; Denne came up with the chorus first, and they wrote most of the song in less than an hour. They took the demo of the song to Hall and Chris Amoo, the lead singer of The Real Thing, and the group recorded the song at the Roundhouse studios a week later.

In the United States, two other versions of the song were released at the same time as the version by the Real Thing, by American groups Broadway and Revelation, whose versions were both released the same week, and at one point all three appeared on the Billboard Hot 100 and R&B charts. Although the version by the Real Thing outsold the other two versions, the confusion with the three different versions effectively prevented each other from becoming a hit in the US.

Commercial performance
The original release of "You to Me Are Everything" reached number one in the UK and stayed there for three weeks. It peaked at No. 22 in Australia, number 3 in Ireland and number 10 in New Zealand.  The original version has been certified silver in the UK for 250,000 single sales.

The song was a minor hit in the US, peaking at number 64 on the Billboard Hot 100 singles chart and number 28 on the Billboard R&B chart.

In 1986, the Decade Remix by DJ Froggy, Simon Harris and KC was released by PRT Records. The remix reached No. 5 in the UK in March.

Charts

Weekly charts 

Original release

The Decade Remix 76-86

Year-end charts 

Original release

The Decade Remix 76-86

Certifications

Sonia version

"You to Me Are Everything" was covered by English pop singer Sonia in 1991. The song was released in November 1991 as the third and final single from her second album. The "Radio Mix" is a new remixed version by Pete Hammond that differs from the album version. The song's B-side, "Be My Baby", is also on the album. This single reached No. 13 in UK and  No. 14 in Ireland.

Track listings
CD single
 "You to Me Are Everything" (Radio Mix) – 3:27
 "You to Me Are Everything" (Extended Mix) – 6:07
 "Be My Baby" – 3:54

7-inch single
 "You to Me Are Everything" – 3:56
 "Be My Baby" – 3:54

12-inch single
 "You to Me Are Everything" (extended mix) – 6:07
 "Be My Baby" – 3:54
 "You to Me Are Everything" (radio mix) – 3:27

Charts

Sean Maguire version

"You to Me Are Everything" was Sean Maguire's fifth single and the second from his second album, Spirit. Maguire's version of the song was released in November 1995 and reached number 16 on the UK Singles Chart.

Track listing
CD1
"You to Me Are Everything"
"You to Me Are Everything" (Extended Mix)
"You to Me Are Everything" (G-Mix Extended)
"Suddenly" (Extended Mix)

CD2
"You to Me Are Everything"
"Suddenly"
"Take This Time"
"Someone to Love"

Cassette
"You to Me Are Everything"
"Lean on Me" (Bill Withers cover)

Other versions
The song has been covered by Frankie Valli, whose version was released as the B-side to "We're All Alone" that reached No. 78 on the Billboard Hot 100. It has also been covered by Tiny Tim and Andy Abraham. Later on, in 1997, songwriter Marina Rei successfully recorded an Italian-language version, "Primavera" ("Spring").. The Song has also been covered by Malaysian artist Dayang Nurfaizah in 2007 which is sung in Bahasa Melayu and titled 'Cerita Cinta Dayang'.

References

1976 songs
1976 singles
1991 singles
1995 singles
Pye Records singles
Parlophone singles
The Real Thing (British band) songs
Sonia (singer) songs
Sean Maguire songs
European Hot 100 Singles number-one singles
UK Singles Chart number-one singles